Park Hye-won (born January 15, 1998), also known by the stage name Hynn (stylised in all caps), is a South Korean singer and songwriter. She was a contestant in Superstar K 2016, where she finished in the top 3. On December 28, 2018, she made her official debut with the single, "Let Me Out".

Career
Hynn first garnered attention when her song "The Lonely Bloom Stands Alone", released on March 31, 2019, had surged to the top 10 of various major real-time music charts six months after its release.

Hynn participated in MBC's King of Mask Singer in 2020, where she was crowned the Mask King once, and was the youngest participant in the show's history to have been crowned the Mask King, at 22 years old. This record was broken when Lee Mu-jin was crowned Mask King in end 2021, when he just turned 21 years old.

She is also part of the seasonal South Korean all-female supergroup WSG Wannabe, which was formed through MBC variety show Hangout with Yoo. Under the supergroup, she became a member of the sub-unit Gaya-G, and with the song "At The Moment", she scored her first music show win in Show! Music Core on July 23, 2022.

Discography

Studio Albums

Extended plays

Single albums

Singles

Soundtrack appearances

Filmography

Television shows

Ambassadorship 
 Public Relations Ambassador of the Incheon Education Bureau (2022)

Awards and nominations

Notes

References

External links 

 HYNN Official YouTube Channel
 
 

1998 births
Living people
South Korean female idols
21st-century South Korean women singers
Superstar K participants
School of Performing Arts Seoul alumni
Musicians from Incheon